Johann Conrad Ammann  (December 24, 1724 in Schaffhausen – October 11, 1811 in Schaffhausen) was a Swiss physician, naturalist, and collector.

After graduating at Leiden in 1749 he began to practise at Schaffhausen. He was particularly noted for his collection of fossils.

He is often confused with Johann Konrad Ammann, born 1669 in Schaffhausen and died 1724 in Warmoud near Leiden.

External links

Brignon A. 2016. — Les poissons téléostéens d’Öhningen (Miocène, Allemagne) de la collection Johann Conrad Ammann étudiés par Georges Cuvier et leur apport à l’histoire de la paléontologie. Geodiversitas 38 (1): 33-64. http:// dx.doi.org/10.5252/g2016n1a3

1724 births
1811 deaths
People from Schaffhausen
Swiss naturalists
18th-century Swiss physicians
18th-century Swiss scientists